is a name given to championships or governing bodies that are based in Japan. It may also refer to:

Combat sport
All Japan Pro Wrestling
All Japan Women's Pro-Wrestling
All Japan Kendo Federation
All Japan Ju-Jitsu International Federation
Federation of All Japan Karatedo Organization
All-Japan Judo Championships
All Japan Judo Federation

Football
All Japan Senior Football Championship
All Japan Women's Football Championship

Motorsport

Cars
All series below are organised or recognised by JAF (Japan Automobile Federation)
All Japan Sports Prototype Championship
All-Japan Formula Three Championship
All-Japan Formula 3000 Championship (1987-1995), former name of Formula Nippon
All-Japan Grand Touring Car Championship, former name of Super GT
All-Japan Professional Drift Championship, former name of D1 Grand Prix
All-Japan Touring Car Championship, alternative name of Japanese Touring Car Championship
JRMCA All-Japan National Championship

Motorcycles
All series are organized by MFJ (Motorcycle Federation of Japan)
All Japan Road Race Championship

Misc
All-Japan Band Association
All-Japan Rugby Football Championship
Kurowashiki All Japan Volleyball Tournament
All Japan Yakiniku Association
All-Japan Figure Skating Championships